Hafsteinsson is an Icelandic patronymic surname. Notable people with the surname include:

Daníel Hafsteinsson (born 1999), Icelandic footballer
Magnús Þór Hafsteinsson (born 1964), Icelandic politician
Vésteinn Hafsteinsson (born 1960), Icelandic discus thrower

Icelandic-language surnames